Aeschylus of Alexandria (Greek ) was an epic poet who must have lived before the end of the 2nd century, and whom Athenaeus calls a well-informed man.  One of his poems bore the title "Amphitryon," and another "Messeniaca."  A fragment of the former is preserved in Athenaeus.  According to Zenobius, he had also written a work on proverbs.

References

Roman-era Alexandrians
Ancient Greek epic poets
Ancient Greek grammarians
2nd-century poets